Sir Alan Bedford Urwick  (2 May 1930 – 8 December 2016) was a British diplomat, who served as Serjeant-at-Arms of the House of Commons from 1989 to 1995.

Early life 
Alan Bedford Urwick was born on 2 May 1930, in London. He was the younger of the two children, of Lt. Col. Lyndall Fownes Urwick  and Joan Wilhelmina Saunders (née Bedford).

Lyndall F. Urwick was one of the British pioneers of scientific management prior to the Second World War. In 1934, he set up his own management consultancy practice, Urwick, Orr & Partners.

Alan Urwick was educated at Dragon School in Oxford, and then at Rugby School in Warwickshire.

Alan Urwick graduated from New College, Oxford, obtaining a first in Modern History in 1952.

Career

MI6

Foreign Office 
Urwick joined the British diplomatic service in 1952 and undertook tours of duty in Western Europe, the Middle East, Moscow, and Washington, D.C. He served as the United Kingdom's ambassador to Jordan (1979–1984) and to Egypt (1985–1987), and was the British High Commissioner in Canada (1987–1989). He left the diplomatic service in 1989.

Serjeant-at-Arms 
He then served as Serjeant-at-Arms of the House of Commons until his retirement in 1995.

Retirement and death 
In retirement, Urwick served as the Chairman of the Anglo-Jordanian Society from 1997 to 2001. He arranged for a memorial service to be held at St. Paul's Cathedral following the death of King Hussein of Jordan in 1999.

Urwick died on 8 December 2016, at the age of 86, at his home in Slaugham, West Sussex.

A memorial service was held at St. Margaret's Church in Westminster Abbey on 19 October 2017.

Personal life 
Urwick married Marta Montagne, the daughter of the Peruvian ambassador to Lebanon, in 1960 in Beirut. They had three sons together, Christopher, Richard, and Michael. Urwick spoke fluent French, German, Russian, Spanish, Italian, and Arabic. Urwick was a member of the Garrick Club and an honorary member of the Worshipful Company of Management Consultants.

References

Further reading

1930 births
2016 deaths
People educated at The Dragon School
People educated at Rugby School
Alumni of New College, Oxford
Ambassadors of the United Kingdom to Jordan
Ambassadors of the United Kingdom to Egypt
High Commissioners of the United Kingdom to Canada
Companions of the Order of St Michael and St George
Knights Commander of the Royal Victorian Order
Serjeants-at-Arms of the British House of Commons
People from Slaugham